Bald is a surname. Notable people with the surname include:

Alexander Bald (1783–1859), Scottish poet
Detlef Bald (born 1941), German political scientist and military historian
Eddie Bald (1874–1946), American cyclist and automobile racing driver
F. Clever Bald (1897–1970), American teacher and director of the Bentley Historical Library at the University of Michigan
John W. Bald (1868–1961), Canadian photographer
Kathy Bald (born 1963), Canadian swimmer
Ken Bald (1920–2019), American illustrator and comic book artist
Robert Bald (1776–1861), Scottish surveyor, civil and mining engineer, and antiquarian, brother of Alexander
William Bald ( 1789–1857), Scottish surveyor, cartographer, and civil engineer, cousin of Alexander and Robert